Martam–Rumtek Assembly constituency is one of the 32 assembly constituencies of Sikkim a north east state of India. Martam-Rumtek is part of Sikkim Lok Sabha constituency. This Constituency is Scheduled Tribe (ST: Bhutia, Lepcha and Sherpa) constituency.

Members of Legislative Assembly

Election results

2019 By-Election

In 2019 Sikkim Legislative Assembly election, Dorjee Tshering Lepcha (D. T. Lepcha) of former ruling SDF won in both Gnathang-Machong and Martam-Rumtek constituencies, so he relinquished Martam-Rumtek seat.

In the by-election, ruling SKM didn't send its candidate to Martam-Rumtek. Meanwhile, former SKM candidate Sonam Tshering Venchungpa moved to opposition BJP, and SKM supported him. In addition, D. T. Lepcha had already moved to BJP in August. Former ruling SDF participated in the Sikkim Legislative Assembly election as the opposition for the first time in 25 years. Opposition SRP sent its candidate to Martam-Rumtek for the first time. Opposition INC boycotted this by-election.

As the result, Sonam Tshering Venchungpa of BJP defeated his nearest rival Nuk Tshering Bhutia of SDF.

2019
Opposition HSP sent its candidate to Martam-Rumtek for the first time.

Dorjee Tshering Lepcha of SDF defeated his nearest rival Sonam Tshering Venchungpa of SKM.

2014
Opposition SKM sent its candidate to Martam-Rumtek for the first time. BJP didn't send its candidate to this constituency.

Mechung Bhutia of SKM defeated his nearest rival Menlom Lepcha of ruling SDF.

See also
 Rumtek
 East Sikkim district
 List of constituencies of Sikkim Legislative Assembly

References

Assembly constituencies of Sikkim
Gangtok district